Group C of EuroBasket 2022 consisted of Croatia, Estonia, Great Britain, Greece, Italy, and Ukraine. The games were played from 2 to 8 September 2022 at the Mediolanum Forum in Milan, Italy. The top four teams advanced to the knockout stage.

Teams

Notes

Standings

Matches
All times are local (UTC+2).

Ukraine vs Great Britain

Croatia vs Greece

Italy vs Estonia

Great Britain vs Croatia

Estonia vs Ukraine

Greece vs Italy

Croatia vs Estonia

Great Britain vs Greece

Ukraine vs Italy

Estonia vs Great Britain

Greece vs Ukraine

Italy vs Croatia

Croatia vs Ukraine

Estonia vs Greece

Great Britain vs Italy

References

External links
Official website

Group C